The Apostolic Vicariate of Leticia in the Catholic Church is located in the city of Leticia, Amazonas, in Colombia.

History
On 8 February 1951 Pope Pius XII established the Prefecture Apostolic of Leticia from the Vicariate Apostolic of Caquetá.   Blessed John Paul II elevated it to a Vicariate Apostolic on 23 October 2000.

Ordinaries
Marceliano Eduardo Canyes Santacana, O.F.M. Cap. † (11 Jan 1952 – 4 Mar 1989) Resigned
Alfonso Yepes Rojo † (4 Mar 1989 – 21 May 1990) Died
Sede vacante (21 May 1990 – 8 Jul 1997)
William de Jesús Ruiz Velásquez (8 Jul 1997 – 23 Oct 2000) Resigned
José de Jesús Quintero Díaz (23 Oct 2000 – present)

See also
Roman Catholicism in Colombia

Sources

Apostolic vicariates
Roman Catholic dioceses in Colombia
Christian organizations established in 1951
1951 establishments in Colombia